"Doing That Scrapyard Thing" is a song from  British group Cream's 1969 farewell album, Goodbye. Composed by the band's bassist, Jack Bruce, with lyrics by Pete Brown, the song, alongside Eric Clapton's "Badge" and Ginger Baker's "What a Bringdown," was one of Cream's final studio recordings.

Background
According to Pete Brown, Jack Bruce approached him to write the lyrics of the song in a telephone call:

Eric Clapton explained that the song, along with the other studio cuts from Goodbye, were recorded due to a lack of proper live material for the album:

Release and reception
"Doing That Scrapyard Thing" was released on Goodbye in February 1969. In some European countries, the song was used as the B-side of "Badge" instead of "What a Bringdown". AllMusic critic Stephen Thomas Erlewine praised the song as "an overstuffed near-masterpiece filled with wonderful, imaginative eccentricities."

Personnel
Eric Claptonguitar
Jack Brucebass, vocals, piano
Ginger Bakerdrums
Felix PappalardiMellotron

References

Cream (band) songs
1969 singles
Songs written by Jack Bruce
Polydor Records singles
1969 songs
Atco Records singles